Geronimo Bruni, an Italian painter and etcher known for battle scenes, was a pupil of Jacques Courtois. He was active at Naples in 1660–70.

References

17th-century Italian painters
Italian male painters
Italian Baroque painters
Italian battle painters
Painters from Naples